Starting its third season, the 2009 Red Bull MotoGP Rookies Cup season continued the search for future World Champions. The 2009 season begins with two races during the Spanish Grand Prix weekend at Jerez on May 2 and May 3 and ends with another double header at the Czech Republic Grand Prix in Brno on August 15 and August 16. Another six European GPs see single Rookies races on each Saturday, making it an eight-race championship, which is two more races than the last season.

The commercial rights of the championship are held by the rights-holders for the MotoGP World Championships, Dorna Sports.

The Czech Jakub Kornfeil was proclaimed champion in the last race, in only his second season of road racing.

Calendar

Entry list
Notes
All Entrants were riding a KTM
Tyres were supplied by Dunlop

Season standings

Scoring system
Points are awarded to the top fifteen finishers. Rider has to finish the race to earn points.

Riders' standings

External links
 Official Site
 Season at FIM-Website

References

Red Bull MotoGP Rookies Cup
Red Bull MotoGP Rookies Cup racing seasons